Abor people may refer to:

 The Adi people of the hills of Nyingchi Prefecture, Tibet
 The Anlo Ewe of southeastern Ghana and southwestern Togo
 The Galo tribe of Arunāchal Pradesh, India

See also
 Abor (disambiguation)